Pescolanciano is a comune (municipality) in the Province of Isernia in the Italian region Molise, located about  northwest of Campobasso and about  northeast of Isernia.

Pescolanciano borders the following municipalities: Agnone, Carovilli, Chiauci, Civitanova del Sannio, Miranda, Pietrabbondante, Sessano del Molise.
 
Sights include the Castello D'Alessandro, built perhaps around 583 during the reign of Lombard king Alboin, or later under Charlemagne.  The first historical mentions are from the 13th century. Located on the spur overlooking the town, it has a massive pentagonal plan.

References

Cities and towns in Molise